Alfred 'Alf' Smith was a Scottish footballer who played in the early 1890s.

Career
Smith played club football in Scotland and began his career with Dumbarton.  He then turned "professional" with a move to Third Lanark.

Honours
Dumbarton
 Scottish League: Champions 1891–1892
 Dumbartonshire Cup: Winners 1891–1892;1892–1893;1893–1894

References

Scottish footballers
Dumbarton F.C. players
Third Lanark A.C. players
Scottish Football League players
Year of birth missing
Year of death missing
Association football fullbacks